This is a list of Latino superheroes, either from Latin America or of Latin American descent.

AAA Comics
 Slug (Atomix)
 Sebastian Cristea (Colentina)

AC Comics
 Fawn (Starforce 6)
 Rayda (half Mexican, Femforce)

Adelita Comic Books
 El Monje Negro / The Black Monk (Mexican)

Antarctic Press
 La Chichona Mendoza or Chesty Mendoza, female wrestler turned superhero

Archie Comics

Archie Comics

Azteca Productions
 El Gato Negro (Agustin Guerrero)
 El Gato Negro (II) (Francisco Guerrero)
 Calibre (Team Tejas)
 Lonestarr (Team Tejas, Jonathan Gonzales)
 Reata (Team Tejas, Vanessa Castillo)
 Relampago (Marcos Zapata)

Burrerias de Editormex
 Hermelinda Linda (Mexican witch, August 1965)

Circus
 Felina (of Spanish and French descent, 1979)

Click! Comics
 Rattler
 Rico Chico / Rich Kid
 Santana
 Santo / Saint

Clip Comics
 Mantis (Mexican superhero, January 1994)

Dark Horse Comics
 Clownface
 Nick Cruz (R.I.P.D.)
 Panda

DC Comics

DC Universe

The Guardian Line

Hanna-Barbera
 El Kabong (a.k.a. Quick Draw McGraw)

Homage Comics

Impact Comics

Milestone Comics

Wildstorm

Disney Publishing Worldwide

Dreamers Magazine
 Apisonador / Roller (Spanish, 2000)
 Capitán Vengador / Captain Avenger (Spanish, 2000)
 Hombre de Negro / Man in Black (Spanish, 2000)
 Maximus (Spanish, 2000)
 Mujer de Rosa / Rose Woman (Spanish, 2000)
 Oskuro (Spanish, 2000)

Ediciones Jose G.Cruz
 El Vampiro Tenebroso (Mexican vampire)
 Santo El Enmascarado de Plata (Mexican Wrestler, very popular due to his movies, comic books and his wrestler career)
 El Valiente (A Mexican cowboy)
 Juan sin Miedo (Another Mexican cowboy)
 Adelita (First Female Mexican hero)
 Apolo (A globetrotter crime fighter, based on a Mexican wrestler)

Gauntlet Comics
 Diabla (UNForce)
 Fuego (UNForce)

Group EsComic
 Aqua (Mexican, los Vigilantes del Agua / The Watchmen of the Water)
 Beto (Mexican, los Vigilantes del Agua / The Watchmen of the Water)
 Mauriman (Mexican, los Vigilantes del Agua / The Watchmen of the Water)
 Nico (Mexican, los Vigilantes del Agua / The Watchmen of the Water)
 Paolo (Mexican, los Vigilantes del Agua / The Watchmen of the Water)
 Rossana (Mexican, los Vigilantes del Agua / The Watchmen of the Water)

Image Comics/Top Cow
 Avatar of Earth (Avatars of Good)
 The Darkness (Jackie Estacado is of Spanish and Italian descent)
 Dusk (New Force)
 El Diablo (Freedom Force)
 Paula Ramirez of the Specials (Rising Stars)
 Tempest (Stryke Force Puerto Rican)
 Vortex (Regulators)

JBC
 Kiko (Combo Rangers)
 Lisa (Combo Rangers)
 Luke (Combo Rangers)
 Tati (Combo Rangers)

Editorial Novaro
 Anibal 5 (Mexican cyborg)
NOVARO COVERS

Latinographix 
 Diary of a Reluctant Dreamer (Undocumented Vignettes from a Pre-American Life) by Alberto Ledesma.

 Angelitos by Ilan Stavans and Santiago Cohen.
 Drawing on Anger: Portraits of U.S. Hypocracy by Eric J. García.
 United States of Banana by Boricua Giannina Braschi and Joakim Lindengren in English (2021) on the liberation of Puerto Rico by super heroes Segismundo, Zarathustra, Hamlet, and the Puerto Rican poet Giannina. The villain is the King of the United States of Banana.
 Thunderbolt: An American Tale by WilfredSantiago (2019).
 The Adventures of Chupacabra Charlie by Frederick Luis Aldama and Chris Escobar.

la Editoral RaCaNa
 Aguila Solitaria / Lone Eagle (Mexican, 1976)
 Arandu, El Principe de la Selva / Arandu, The Prince of the Forests (South American, 1970)

Los Comex
 El Muerto (Real Name: Diego de la Muerte, alias El Muerto: The Aztec Zombie, Mexican-American)

Manga Mix
 Cyber-Beast (Mexican, 1998)
 Destello (Mexican, 1998)
 Los Magnificos (a team of Mexican superheroes)

Marvel Comics

Marvel Universe
{| class="wikitable"
|-
! Character
! Alias
! Ethnicity
! Classification
! First Appearance
|-
|Ajak
|The Legendary Inca Hero, Tecumotzin Lord of Flight
|Peruvian
|Hero
|The Eternals #2 (August 1976)
|-
|Agony
|Leslie Gesneria
|Unknown
|Villain
|Venom: Lethal Protector #4
|-
|El Aguila (The Eagle)
|Paco Montoya, Alejandro Montoya
|Spanish
|Hero
|Power Man and Iron Fist #58 (August 1979)
|-
|El Aguila (The Eagle)
|Cuauhtli
|Mexican
|Hero
|Marvel Westerns: Outlaw Files
|-
|Allegra
|Allegra
|Unknown
|Unknown
|Marvel Comics Presents #150
|-
|Antonio Argent
|Antonio Argent
|South America
|Hero
|X-Men: The 198 #1
|-
|Araña/Spider-Girl II
|Anya Sofia Corazon
|Mexican / Puerto Rican
|Hero
|Amazing Fantasy (vol. 2) #1 (November 2004)
|-
|Arclight
|Philippa Sontag
|Unknown
|Unknown
|
|-
|Armadillo
|Antonio Rodriguez
|United States
|Villain
|Captain America #308
|-
|Armena Ortega
|Armena Ortega
|Cuban
|Hero
|District X #2
|-
|Asylum
|Henrique Manuel Gallante
|Unknown
|Villain
|The New Warriors #32
|-
|Auteur
|Alex Flores
|Unknown
|Hero
|Wonder Man #2
|-
|La Bandera
|Teresa Lopez
|Cuban
|Hero
|Wolverine (vol. 2) #19 (December 1989)
|-
|Bantam
|Robert Velasquez
|Puerto Rican
|Hero
|Captain America Annual #12
|-
|Becca the Earthgirl
|Becca Rodriguez
|Unknown
|Unknown
|Weirdworld #5
|-
|Beetle
|Janice Lincoln
|Half Dominican
|Villain
|Captain America #607 - No Escape, Part 2
|-
|Bloody Bess
|Bloody Bess
|Unknown
|Villain
|The Uncanny X-Men #384 (September 2000)
|-
|Calavera
|Unknown
|Unknown
|Villain
|Daredevil: Reborn #3
|-
|Captain Universe
|Gabriel Vargas
|Chicano (Mexican American)
|Hero
|
|-
|Carlos Rodriguez
|Carlos Rodriguez
|Unknown
|Villain
|Young X-Men #3
|-
|Chango
|Unknown
|Unknown
|Hero
|Daredevil Father #2 (October, 2005)
|-
|Cheetah
|Esteban Carracus
|Mexican
|Villain
|Captain Marvel #48 (January 1977)
|-
|Crusher, AKA El Profesor
|Unknown
|Cuban
|Hero
|Tales of Suspense #91 (July 1967)
|-
|Crusher
|Juan Aponte
|Unknown
|Hero
|Daredevil #119 (March 1975)
|-
|Darwin
|Armando Munoz
|African American / Hispanic
|Hero
|X-Men: Deadly Genesis #2
|-
|Defensor
|Gabriel Carlos Dantes Sepulveda
|Argentinian
|Hero
|Marvel Super Hero Contest of Champions #1
|-
|Doghead
|Unknown
|Unknown
|Villain
|Ghost Rider #89
|-
|Don of the Dead
|Unknown
|Mexican
|Villain
|Taskmaster (vol. 2) #2 (2010)
|-
|Egg
|Fabio Medina
|United States
|Hero
|The Uncanny X-Men (vol. 3) #1
|-
|El Condor
|Unknown
|Unknown
|Hero
|Captain America #442 (August 1995)
|-
|El Dragon
|Marco
|Unknown
|Unknown
|Young Allies #1
|-
|El Tigre
|Juan Meroz
|Santo Rico (fictional)
|Villain
|X-Men #25 (October 1966) 
|-
|Eleggua
|Nestor Rodriguez
|Unknown
|Hero
|Daredevil 
|-
|Empath
|Manuel Alfonso Rodrigo de la Rocha
|Spanish
|Villain
|The New Mutants #16 (June 1984)
|-
|Esteban Ortega
|Esteban Ortega
|Cuban
|Unknown
|District X #2
|-
|Faire De Lain
|Snake Clan Leader
|Peruvian
|Villain
|Peter Parker: Spider Man Annual 2001 (January 2002)
|-
|Falcon
|Joaquin Torres
|Mexican
|Hero
|Captain America: Sam Wilson #1
|-
|Feral
|Maria Callasantos
|Unknown
|Hero
|The New Mutants #99 (March 1991)
|-
|Firebird
|Bonita Juarez
|Chicano (Mexican American)
|Hero
|The Incredible Hulk (vol. 2) #265
|-
|Flourish
|Marisol Guerra
|Mexican
|Hero
|Storm (vol. 3) #1
|-
|Gideon
|Gideon
|Spanish
|Villain
|The New Mutants #98 (February 1991)
|-
|Ghost Rider (Reyes)
|Roberto "Robbie" Reyes
|Chicano (Mexican American)
|Hero
|All-New Ghost Rider #1 (March 2014)
|-
|Ghost Rider (Jones)
|Alejandra Jones
|Unknown
|Villain
|Ghost Rider (vol. 7) #1 (September 2011)
|-
|Helix
|Rafael Carago
|United States
|Hero
|Maximum Clonage Alpha (August 1995)
|-
|HighNote
|Raoul Hernandez
|Colombian
|Hero
|Thor #300 (October 1980)
|-
|Hit-Maker
|Orlando Sinclair
|African American / Mexican American
|Villain
|Wonder Man Annual #2
|-
|Horacio de la Fuente
|Horacio de la Fuente
|Mexican
|Unknown
|Silver Surfer (vol. 6) #3 (June 2011)
|-
|Hummingbird
|María Aracely Josefina Penalba de las Heras
|Mexican
|Hero
|Scarlet Spider (vol. 2) #1(January 2012)
|-
|Huntara
|Mary Elizabeth Alvarez AKA Tara Richards
|Unknown
|Villain
|Fantastic Four #377
|-
|Inferno
|Dante Pertuz
|Colombian
|Hero
|Inhuman #1 - Part 1: Genesis
|-
|Ink
|Eric Gitter
|Unknown
|Hero
|Young X-Men #1
|-
|El Jaguar
|Unknown
|Unknown
|Villain
|Daredevil #120 (April 1975)
|-
|El Yogi
|Julio Rodriguez
|Unknown
|Villain
|Young X-Men #3
|-
|Jaguar Priest
|Villac Umu
|Peruvian
|Villain
|Skull The Slayer #6 (July 1976)
|-
|Junk
|Daniel Silva
|Unknown
|Hero
|Death of Wolverine: The Weapon X Program #1 (January, 2015)
|-
|Junta
|Manuel Diego Armand Vicente
|Vulcan Domuyo (fictional)
|Villain
|Black Panther (vol. 3) #9
|-
|Killian
|Killian
|Unknown
|Villain
|The Uncanny X-Men #384 (September 2000)
|-
|Juan Meroz
|
|Mexican
|Villain
|X-Men #25 (October 1966)
|-
|Lady Deathstrike (Cortes)
|Ana Cortes
|Colombian
|Villain
|X-Men (vol. 4) #7 (January 2014)
|-
|Laserfist
|Raphael Suarez
|Unknown
|Unknown
|Fantastic Four #389
|-
|Lasher
|Unknown
|Argentinian
|Villain
|Venom: Lethal Protector #4
|-
|Living Lightning
|Miguel Santos
|United States
|Hero
|The Avengers West Coast #63 (October 1990)
|-
|Luz Delgado
|Luz Delgado
|Unknown
|Unknown
|Ghost Rider (vol. 3) #8
|-
|Machete
|Ferdinand Lopez
|San Diablo (fictional)
|Villain
|Captain America #302 (February 1985)
|-
|Machete
|Alfonso Lopez
|Unknown
|Unknown
|Elektra #7
|-
|Machete
|Mariano Lopez
|San Diablo (fictional)
|Villain
|Great Lakes Avengers #2 (July 2005)
|-
|Makina
|Unknown
|Unknown
|Unknown
|Spider-Man: Friends and Enemies #1
|-
|Manuel Enduque
|Manuel Enduque
|Unknown
|Villain
|X-Men: Schism #2 (September, 2011)
|-
|Masacre
|Unknown
|Mexican
|Villain
|Deadpool (vol. 3) #3.1
|-
|Mercedes Merced
|Mercedes Merced
|Unknown
|Hero
|Taskmaster (vol. 2) #1 (November 2010)
|-
|Medico Mistico
|Unknown
|Mexican
|Villain
|Doctor Strange (vol. 4) #4 - The Art of Puking Without Puking
|-
|Miguel
|Miguel Legar
|Unknown
|Hero
|The Amazing Spider-Man #508
|-
|Miss America (America Chavez)
|America Chavez
|Puerto Rican
|Hero
|Vengeance #1 (2011)
|-
|El Muerto
|Juan-Carlos Estrada Sanchez
|Unknown
|Hero
|Friendly Neighborhood Spider-Man #6 (May 2006)
|-
|Naja
|Naja
|Unknown
|Hero
|Inhuman #5
|-
|Nocturne
|Angela Cairn
|Half Cuban
|Hero
|The Spectacular Spider-Man #190 (July 1992)
|-
|Noise
|Unknown
|Mexican
|Unknown
|
|-
|Nova
|Sam Alexander
|Mexican
|Hero
|Marvel Point One one-shot (October 2011)
|-
|Ojo Macabra
|Candelaria Vélez
|Unknown
|Hero
|Captain America #442 (August 1995)
|-
|Pathfinder
|Nick Rodriguez
|Unknown
|Unknown
|Alpha Flight #1 (December 1985)
|-
|Pit Bull
|Unknown
|Mexican
|Unknown
|The Incredible Hulk (vol. 3) #8
|-
|Poison
|Cecilia Cardinale
|Cuban
|Hero
|Web of Spider-Man Annual #4 (1988)
|-
|Power Man
|Victor Alvarez
|Afro Dominican
|Hero
|Shadowland: Power Man #1 (October 2010)
|-
|Raul Quentino
|Raul Quentino
|Unknown
|Villain
|
|-
|Rafael Vega
|Rafael Vega
|Puerto Rican
|Hero
|Wolfpack #1 (August 1988)
|-
|Ranger
|Jesus Suarez
|Puerto Rican
|Villain
|The Uncanny X-Men #261
|-
|Rapidfire
|Hector
|Unknown
|Unknown
|Cage #1
|-
|Red Locust
|Fernanda Ramirez
|Mexican
|Hero
|Champions #9
|-
|Reptil
|Humberto Lopez
|Mexican
|Hero
|Avengers: The Initiative Featuring Reptil #1
|-
|Cecilia Reyes
|Cecilia Reyes
|Puerto Rican
|Hero
|X-Men (vol. 2) #65
|-
|Rictor
|Julio Esteban "Ric" Richter
|Mexican
|Hero
|X-Factor #17 (June 1987)
|-
|Rigger
|Margarita Ruiz
|Unknown
|Hero
|
|-
|Ripper
|Unknown
|Unknown
|Unknown
|Ghost Rider
|-
|Riptide
|Janos Quested
|Mexican
|Villain
|The Uncanny X-Men #211
|-
|Risque
|Gloria Dolores Munoz
|Half Cuban
|Hero
|X-Force #51
|-
|Salamander
|Unknown
|Mexican
|Villain
|Scarlet Spider (vol. 2) #1 (March, 2012)
|-
|Sangre (Blood)
|Unknown
|Unknown
|Villain
|X-Men #188 (September 2006)
|-
|Satana
|Satana, AKA Maria Ramos
|Unknown
|Villain
|Supernaturals #1 (December, 1998)
|-
|Saw Fist
|Unknown
|Mexican
|Villain
|Wolverine (vol. 4) #1
|-
|Scorn
|Tanis Nieves
|Unknown
|Hero
|Carnage #1
|-
|Scream
|Donna Diego
|Unknown
|Villain
|Venom: Lethal Protector #4
|-
|Senor Muerte/Senor Suerte (Mr. Death/Mr. Luck)
|Ramon Garcia
|Puerto Rican
|Villain
|Hero For Hire #10 (June 1973)
|-
|Senor Muerte (Mr. Death)
|Phillip Garcia
|Puerto Rican
|Villain
|Captain America #224 (August 1978)
|-
|Senor Suerte (Mr. Luck)
|Jaime Garcia
|Puerto Rican
|Villain
|Power Man and Iron Fist #56 (April 1979)
|-
|Silverclaw
|Maria De Guadalupe "Lupe" Santiago
|Costa Verde (fictional)
|Hero
|The Avengers (vol. 3) #8 (September 1998)
|-
|Sister Salvation
|Unknown
|Unknown
|Hero
|Wolverine (vol. 2) #18
|-
|Skin
|Angelo Espinosa
|Puerto Rican
|Hero
|The Uncanny X-Men #317
|-
|Slingshot
|Yo-Yo Rodriguez
|Puerto Rican
|Hero
|The Mighty Avengers #13 (July 2008)
|-
|Snap
|Ginger Beach
|Unknown
|Hero
|Wonder Man #1
|-
|Spectro
|Hector Cervantez
|Unknown
|Unknown
|Silk #1
|-
|Spider-Man
|Miles Morales
|Afro Puerto Rican
|Hero
|Ultimate Fallout #4
|-
|Spider-Man 2099
|Miguel O'Hara
|Chicano (Mexican American)
|Hero
|The Amazing Spider-Man #365
|-
|Stat / Spider
|Esteban Beach
|Unknown
|Hero
|Wonder Man #3
|-
|Sunspot
|Roberto "Bobby" da Costa
|Brazilian / American
|Hero
|Marvel Graphic Novel #4: The New Mutants
|-
|Synapse
|Emily Guerrero
|Unknown
|Hero
|The Uncanny Avengers (vol. 3) #1
|-
|Tag
|Brian Cruz
|Puerto Rican
|Hero
|The New Mutants (vol. 2) #7 (January 2004)
|-
|Taran
|Spider Clan (High Priestess)
|Peruvian
|Hero
|Peter Parker: Spiderman Annual 2001 (January 2002)
|-
|Tarantula
|Clay Riley
|Unknown
|Villain
|Ghost Rider #2 (April 1967)
|-
|Tarantula
|Anton Miguel Rodriguez
|Republic of Delvadia (fictional)
|Villain
|The Amazing Spider-Man #134 (July 1974)
|-
|Tarantula
|Luis Alvarez
|Republic of Delvadia (fictional)
|Villain
|Web of Spider-Man #35 (February 1988)
|-
|Tarantula
|Maria Vasquez
|Unknown
|Villain
|Heroes for Hire (vol. 2) #1 (2006)
|-
|Tattoo Artist
|Leon Nunez
|United States
|Hero
|Young X-Men #1
|-
|Taurus
|Roberto Ferrar
|Unknown
|Villain
|New Warriors (vol. 4) #4 - Defiant: Part 4
|-
|Tempest
|Angel Salvadore
|Unknown
|Hero
|X-Force #6 (January 1992)
|-
|Thornn
|Lucia Callasantos
|Unknown
|Hero
|New X-Men #118 (2001)
|-
|Tiboro
|Sorcerer Supreme of the Sixth Dimension
|Peruvian
|Villain
|Strange Tales #129 (February 1965)
|-
|Tito Bohusk
|Tito Bohusk
|Unknown
|Hero
|
|-
|Toltec
|Unknown
|Mexican
|Villain
|Moon Knight (vol. 5) #27
|-
|Tores
|Miguela Tores
|Unknown
|Unknown
|Generation X #21
|-
|Toro
|Benito Serrano
|Colombian
|Hero
|Young Allies (vol. 2) #1
|-
|El Toro (Bull)
|Benito Serrano
|Cuban
|Unknown
|Tales to Astonish #54 (April 1963)
|-
|El Toro Negro (The Black Bull)
|Sergio Torres
|Unknown
|Villain
|The Amazing Scarlet Spider #2 (December 1995)
|-
|Toro Rojo (Red Bull)
|Tupac Amaru
|Peruvian
|Hero
|Thor #290 - Ring around The Red Bull (December 1979)
|-
|Truthsayer
|Unknown
|Unknown
|Hero
|Darkhold: Pages from the Book of Sins #16
|-
|Uplink
|Hector Fuentes
|Unknown
|Unknown
|Sleepwalker #7
|-
|Vargas
|Unknown
|Spain
|Villain
|X-Treme X-Men #1 (2001)
|-
|Velocidad
|Gabriel Cohuelo
|Mexican
|Hero
|The Uncanny X-Men #527
|-
|Vengeance
|Michael Badilino
|Unknown
|Villain
|Ghost Rider (vol. 3) #21
|-
|El Vejigante
|Miguel Rodriguez
|Puerto Rican
|Hero
|Fantastic Four in...Ataque Del M.O.D.O.K.! #1
|-
|Victorious
|Victor Mancha
|Chicano (Mexican American)
|Hero
|Runaways (vol. 2) #1 (April 2005)
|-
|White Tiger
|Hector Ayala
|Puerto Rican
|Hero
|The Deadly Hands of Kung Fu #19 (December 1975)
|-
|White Tiger
|Angela del Toro
|Puerto Rican
|Hero
|Daredevil (vol. 2) #51 (November 2003)
|-
|White Tiger
|Ava Ayala
|Puerto Rican
|Hero
|Avengers Academy #20
|-
|Wind Dancer
|Sofia Mantega
|Venezuelan
|Hero
|The New Mutants (vol. 2) #1 (July 2003)
|-
|Windeagle
|Hector Santiago Ruiz
|Dominican 
|Villain
|Jungle Action #24 (November 1976)
|-
|Wolf
|Unknown
|Mexican
|Hero
|Captain America #269 (May 1982)
|-
|Wraith
|Hector Rendoza
|Unknown
|Hero
|
|-
|Yellowjacket (DeMara)
|Rita DeMara
|Unknown
|Villain
|The Avengers #264
|-
|Zona Rosa
|Zona Rosa
|Unknown
|Hero
|Captain America #442 (August 1995)
|}

Marvel UK
 Pacer of the Gene Dogs
 Perez of Warheads (Mexican)
 Villarosa of Mercy Corps
EARTH-TRN521
 Arácnido (Mexican)

MC2
 Argo the Almighty (half, son of Hercules)
 Black Tarantula (Fabian)

Marvel 1602
Carlos Javier, counterpart of Charles Xavier

Marvel 2099
 Book (Mexican, X-Men)
 Breakdown (Mexican)
 Brimstone Love (Mexican)
 Captain America / Roberta Mendez
 Darkson / Joachim Eduardo Vasquez (Mexican)
 La Lunatica / Luna of the X-Men (Mexican)
 Quirk (Part Mexican)
 Rosa (Mexican)
 Spider-Man 2099 (Mexican-American)

New Universe
 Golem in the Paranormal Army
 Relampago / Lightning of Medusas Web (Chilean)

Ultimate Marvel
Antonio Stark, Ultimate Iron Man, Hispanic on his mother's side
Captain Spain [Carlos Fraile]
Scorpion [Maximus Gargan], Mexican
Spider-Man II, Miles Morales is half African-American, half-Hispanic.

Ultraverse/Malibu
Mantra, Lukasz
Prototype, Jimmy Ruiz

Misión Santiago
 Capitan Chile (Chilean, November 2001)

Ocean Comics
 Street Fighter (Puerto Rican)

Planeta/Laberinto
 Aníbal Gris (Spanish)
 Aquaviva (Spanish, Iberia Inc.)
 Capitan Furia / Captain Fury (Spanish, Iberia Inc.)
 Cascabel / Bell (Spanish, Triada Vertice)
 Dolmen (Spanish, Iberia Inc.)
 Drac de Ferro / Iron Dragon (Spanish, Iberia Inc.)
 Estigma / Stigma (Spanish, Triada Vertice)
 Flechita / Little Arrow (Spanish, Iberia Inc.)
 Gavilan / Sparrowhawk (Spanish)
 Lince Dorado / Golden Lynx (Spanish, Iberia Inc.)
 Lobisome (Spanish, Iberia Inc.)
 Melkart (Spanish, Iberia Inc.)
 Mihura (Spanish, Triada Vertice)
 Sangre / Blood (Spanish, Jaque Mate)
 Traka (Spanish, Iberia Inc.)
 Trasnu (Spanish, Iberia Inc.)
 Trueno / Thunder (Spanish, Iberia Inc.)

Portal Comics
 Apolo (Liga de los Vengadores / League of Avengers)
 Argentineman, (La Liga de Plato / The Silver League)
 Asterisco / Asterisk (Argentine)
 Atalanta (Los Universales)
 El Avisador / Warning man (Argentine, La Liga de Plato / The Silver League)
 Bandera / Flag (Argentine, La Liga de Plato / The Silver League)
 Batería Azul / Blue Battery (Argentine, La Liga de Plato / The Silver League)
 Baudioman (Argentine, La Liga de Plato / The Silver League)
 Bicho / Bug (Argentine, La Liga de Plato / The Silver League)
 Capitán Rioplatense / Riverplate Captain (Argentine, La Liga de Plato / The Silver League)
 Chanchman / Pig man (Argentine, La Liga de Plato / The Silver League)
 Eléctrico / Electric (Argentine, La Liga de Plato / The Silver League)
 Escarlata / Scarlet (Los Universales)
 Fábula / Fabulous (Argentine, La Liga de Plato / The Silver League)
 Fantasy (Los Universales)
 Farmaboy (Argentine, La Liga de Plato / The Silver League)
 Hades (Liga de los Vengadores / League of Avengers)
 Helios (Liga de los Vengadores / League of Avengers)
 Hermes (Liga de los Vengadores / League of Avengers)
 Hunter (Los Universales)
 Ínfimo (Argentine, La Liga de Plato / The Silver League)
 Lumbrí de Seda / Silk Worm (Argentine, La Liga de Plato / The Silver League)
 Poseidon (Liga de los Vengadores / League of Avengers)
 Powerman (Los Universales)
 Rata-man / Rat-man (Argentine, La Liga de Plato / The Silver League)
 Supermarcos (Argentine, La Liga de Plato / The Silver League)
 Supremo / Supreme (Los Universales)
 Titan (Los Universales)
 Titania  (Los Universales)
 Vengador / Avenger (Los Universales)

PS238
Alejandro Torres, code-named The Flea.

PsyComix
 Cerdotado (Mexican comic, anthropomorphic pig)

Publicaciones Herrerías
 Alma Grande, el Yaqui Justiciero (Mexican Yaqui, July 1961)

Rio Bravo Comics
 El Peso Hero (first norteño Mexican superhero, July 2011)

Shibalba Press
 el Bulbo / The Bulb (Mexican comic, anthropomorphic lightbulb)

Toukan
 Meteorix (Mexican superhero)

Visual Ediciones
 Diablo / Devil (Chilean, Bandido imprint, 1996)

Independents
 Aguila Negra / Black Eagle (Mexican cowboy)
 Aguila Roja / Red Eagle (Mexican hero)
 Alcotán (Spanish, Escuardo Guernica)
 Amigoman – The Latin Avenger [Bilingual – USA (Span/Eng)]
 Angel Negro / Black Angel (Uruguay)
 La Antorcha / The Torch (Spanish, Encapuchado)
 Aqua (Mexican comic)
 Araña Verde / Green Spider (Mexican comic)
 Atome Kid / Kid Atom (Spanish)
 Azor el primitivo / Azor the Primitive (Mexican Tarzan-like character, 1964)
 Black (Chile, Ilumina Studio)
 Boro-Kay (Spanish)
 Borromeo (Mexican, Los Superfrios, 1960s)
 La Bruma / the Mist (Spanish, Circulo Justiciero)
 El Búho / The Owl (Mexican superhero)
 Caballero Rojo / Red Knight (from Argentina)
 Camisa Blanca / White Shirt (Spanish, Escuardo Guernica)
 Capitan Jupiter (Chilean, Space Patrol)
 Capitan Leo (Peruvian)
 Carita (Mexican, Los Superfrios, 1960s)
 Cazador (Argentine)
 Chanoc (Mexican comic created by Ángel Mora (artist) and P.Z. Fernández (writer).)
 Circulo de Superheroes (Spanish)
 Clavel (Spanish, Escuardo Guernica)
 Count (Mexican, Los Superfrios, 1960s)
 Cybersix (Argentine)
 Dave Speed (Spanish, Poliziotto superpiù, 1980)
 Duck Girl (granddaughter of Xochiquetzal (Aztec goddess) and Horus; Andromeda and Bishamon)
 El Duende (Mexican superhero)
 El Encapuchado (Spanish, la colección Misterio 1943)
 Enigma (Mexican superhero)
 Espada / Sword (Spanish, Escuardo Guernica)
 El Eternauta / Eternity Traveller (Argentine, Hora Cero Semanal)
 Finch – Duck-Girl's sufficient sidekick (South American ninja / Half-Latina; speaks Portuguese only) (Duck-Girl season 3)
 Fly Man (Argentine, Supervolador)
 Gardino (Mexican, Los Superfrios, 1960s)
 El Gavilán / The Sparrowhawk (Mexican superhero, Hombres Intrépidos presentan / Intrepid Men, 1960)
 Graviman (Argentine, Supervolador)
 Guardián invisible (Mexican superhero)
 El Chispa (Argentine)
 El Gallo (Argentine)
 El Guerrero del Antifaz created by Manuel Gago García.
 El Halcon Blanco / The White Hawk (Mexican superhero)
 El Hombre Aguila / Eagle Man (Mexican superhero)
 El Hombre Araña / Spider Man (Spanish)
 El Hombre Eléctrico / Electric Man (Spanish)
 El Hombre Invisible / The Invisible Man (Mexican hero from the 1950s and 1960s)
 El Hombre Mosca / Man Fly (Mexican superhero, Hombres Intrépidos / Intrepid Men, April 1960)
 El Hombre de Negro / The Man in Black (Mexican superhero)
 Imagen Extrema (Spanish)
 los Invencibles (Mexican duo, Zor y los Invencibles)
 El Jinete Fantasma / The Ghost Rider (Chilean)
 Korvus (Argentine)
 El Lama Carmesí / Crimson Lama (Spanish, Circulo Justiciero)
 Legión Justiciera (Spanish)
 Libertad / Liberty (Spanish, Escuardo Guernica)
 la Llanera Vengadora (Mexican hero, Flor Silvestre, la Llanera Vengadora)
 Mampato (Chilean)
 Manticore (Spanish)
 La Máscara Roja / The Red Mask (Mexican superhero)
 Murciélaga She-Bat (Hispanic American, Created by Dærick Gröss)
 Murciélago / Bat (Mexican superhero)
 Ogú (caveman from ancient Chile)
 Orion (Created by Modesto Vazque R, 1981)
 Paloma Roja / Red Dove (Spanish, Escuardo Guernica)
 El Pantera / The Panther (Mexican)
 Pantera Roja / Red Panther (Mexican)
 Patoruzú (Argentine)
 El Pequeño Pantera Negra / The Small Black Panther (Spanish)
 Quintin (Mexican, Los Superfrios, 1960s)
 Radius,  / Radius, the Incredible Man (Mexican superhero created by V. Arzote (writer) and R.L. Gayten and A. Segura (artists), 1965)
 Relámpago,  / Lightning, the Incredible Being (1960's Mexican superhero)
 Rena (from 40th C. Chile)
 Scratchbuilt (Half Miskito, Half Central American, F.R.E.E.Lancers)
 El Señor Destino (Mexican superhero)
 Serpio (Mexican cyborg, El Camino Amarillo, November 2002)
 Sónoman (Argentine)
 Starman (Mexican superhero)
 El Supergrupo (Spanish)
 Superhijitus (Argentine)
 SuperLopez (Spanish)
 Supermaya
 Supervolador / Super-flier (Argentine)
 Tawa, el hombre gacela (Mexican, Created by Joaquin Cervantes Bassoco)
 Tess Tinieblas (Spanish)
 Zooman: el Hombre Mosca / Zooman: The Human Fly (Mexican superhero, 1979)
 Zor (robot, from the 1960s Mexican comic Zor y los Invencibles)

Newspapers
 Paco (Los Supersabios / The Super-Wise, Novedades, Mexican newspaper strip, Created by German Butze, January 27, 1936)
 Panza (Los Supersabios / The Super-Wise, Novedades, Mexican newspaper strip, Created by German Butze, January 27, 1936)
 Pepe (Los Supersabios / The Super-Wise, Novedades, Mexican newspaper strip, Created by German Butze, January 27, 1936)
 Paladín el Cacique y Los Campeadores Boricuas (El Nuevo Día, Puerto Rico newspaper strip full-page, full-color tabloid-size Sunday comic, Written and drawn by Nick Iannone, Published from 1992–1998, paladinpr.com on the web)

 Novels 
 El Coyote pulp-western hero created by J. Mallorquí.
 El Guerrero del Antifaz / The Soldier with the Mask created by Manuel Gago García.
 Marco from the book series Animorphs.
 United States of Banana by Giannina Braschi features the madcap adventures of Boricua Giannina, Hamlet, and Zarathustra on their mission to free Segismundo from the dungeon of the Statue of Liberty where he has been imprisoned for 100 years by his father, the villainous King of the United States of Banana. The book has also been produced as a theater play and a comic book by the same title.

Luchadores Enmascarados
 Averno
 Abismo Negro / Black Abyss / Black Hole
 Blue Demon / El Demonio Azul
 Blue Panther
 Cien Caras / Hundred Faces
 Dr. Wagner, Jr.
 Fishman
 El Hijo del Santo / Santito / Son of the Saint
 Huracan Ramirez
 Mil Mascaras / Man of a Thousand Masks
 Mr. Lince
 Místico
 La Mujer Murcielago / The Batwoman
 Neutrón
 Pablo Halkyard / The Sea Bass
 La Parka
 Rey Bucanero / Buccaneer King
 Rey Misterio, Sr.
 Rey Mysterio, Jr.
 El Santo Enmascarado de Plata / Silver Masked Saint
 Silver King / Black Tiger III / César Cuauhtémoc González
 Tinieblas
 Último Guerrero / The Last Warrior

Radio
 Frijolito (Venezuelan)
 Martin Valiente (Venezuelan)
 el Monje Negro / The Black Monk (Mexican, 1936)
 Cisco Kid

Television
 Batmanuel (from The Tick)
 Bender Bending Rodriguez from Futurama Bumblebee Man (parody of El Chapulín Colorado on The Simpsons)
 El Chapulín Colorado / The Red Grasshopper (Mexican TV show)
 Dark Angel (Maxine "Max" Guevara, portrayed by Jessica Alba).
 Eduardo "Ed" Dorado, Jr. of Young Justice Isaac Mendez of Heroes
 Jade (Guatemala Clan, Gargoyles)
 Kennedy of Buffy the Vampire Slayer Marco from the TV series Animorphs La Mascara Negra
 Maya Herrera of Heroes
 Molly Hernandez of Runaways
 Obsidiana (Guatemala Clan, Gargoyles)
 Profesor Super O (Colombia)
 Ricky Fitness of The Aquabats! Super Show!, portrayed by Richard Falomir.
 Super Hijitus
 El Tigre: The Adventures of Manny Rivera El Toro Fuerte from the TV series Jackie Chan Adventures Turquesa (Guatemala Clan, Gargoyles)
 Zafiro (Guatemala Clan, Gargoyles)
 Zorro / the Fox

Video games
 Angel (Mexican, King of Fighters)
 Armor King (Mexican, Tekken)
 Blanka (Brazilian, Street Fighter)
 El Blaze (Mexican, Virtua Fighter 5)
 King (Mexican, Tekken)
 Lisa (Latin American, Dead or Alive)
 Ramon (Mexican, King of Fighters)
 El Stingray (Mexican, Slam Masters)
 Tizoc (Mexican, King of Fighters and Fatal Fury)
 Vega (Spanish, Street Fighter)
 El Fuerte (Mexican, Street Fighter)

Film
Carmen Cortez  (Spy Kids Franchise) / played by Alexa Vega
Gregorio Cortez (Spy Kids Franchise) / played by Antonio Banderas
Juni Cortez (Spy Kids Franchise)  / played by Daryl Sabara
El Coyote in La Vuelta de El Coyote (The Return of El Coyote), played by José Coronado
Machete (played by Danny Trejo)
 Mirageman, played by Marko Zaror
 Puss in Boots / El Gato con Botas (from Shrek 2, Shrek the Third, Shrek Forever After, and Puss in Boots; anthropomorphic cat, voiced by Antonio Banderas)
 Sunspot from X-Men: Days of Future Past, played by Adan Canto
 Supersonic Man (Spanish, 1979)
 Vadinho (Aztec, mentor of Pumaman, L' Uomo puma / Pumaman, ADR Films 1980)
 Zorro / The Fox
 Zovek (Invasión de los muertos, co-starring Blue Demon)
 El Diablo from Suicide Squad (film)'', played by Jay Hernandez

See also 

 American Comic Books
 Ethnic stereotypes in comics
 List of Filipino superheroes
 List of Native American superheroes
 Puerto Rican Comic Books

References

External links
 Latino Superheroes and Supervillains on mun2
 Catalogue of International Superheroes
 Superheroes Lives (superhero movies outside the United States)
 Jorge's Superlists
 Marvel Universe Appendix
 The Religious Affiliation of Comic Book Characters
 DCU Guide

Lists of superheroes